Fidia atra is a species of leaf beetle in the family Chrysomelidae. It is distributed in Japan, China, Korea, and the Russian Far East.

The adult beetle is generally coloured black. In nature, the body is covered with a white powdery excrescence; when rubbed, it has a shining black colour. The distal ends of the tibiae, the tarsi, the basal three segments of the antennae, and the labrum are fulvous in colour.

It was described again by Martin Jacoby in 1885, this time with the white powder, under the name Leprotes pulverulentus. Later that same year, Jacoby realised that his species was identical to Motschulsky's and synonymised his own species with it. The species was later described a third time by Léon Fairmaire in 1889 under the name Talmonus farinosus, which was synonymised by Jacoby the following year.

References

External links

 

Eumolpinae
Beetles of Asia
Taxa named by Victor Motschulsky
Beetles described in 1861
Insects of Japan
Insects of China
Insects of Korea
Insects of Russia
Fauna of the Russian Far East